The 1919 Copa de Competencia Jockey Club was the final that decided the champion of the 13° edition of this National cup of Argentina. In the match, held in Gimnasia y Esgrima de Buenos Aires on January 18, 1920, Boca Juniors defeated Rosario Central 1–0 after extra time.

Qualified teams 

Note

Overview 
The 1919 edition was contested by 48 clubs, 46 within Buenos Aires Province and 2 from Liga Rosarina de Football (Rosario Central and Belgrano) that entered directly to the semifinals. Boca Juniors reached the final after playing Gimnasia y Esgrima LP, Eureka, Racing, eliminating Estudiantes LP (3–0), Porteño (3–2 in quarterfinal), Belgrano de Rosario (2–0 in semifinal)

On the other side, Rosario Central earned its right to play the final after thrashing Eureka 7–0. The only goal of the match was scored by winger Pedro Calomino by penalty kick on 103'. One minute earlier, Américo Tesoriere had stopped a penalty from Blanco.

Match details

References

j
j
1919 in Argentine football
1919 in South American football
Football in Buenos Aires